The Italian geographical region, Italian physical region or Italian region is a geographical subregion of Southern Europe delimited to the north and west by the mountain chains of the Alps. This subregion is composed of a peninsular and continental part and an insular part. Located between the Balkan Peninsula and the Iberian Peninsula, it protrudes into the centre of the Mediterranean Sea and overlooks the Adriatic Sea, the Ionian Sea, the Ligurian Sea, the Sardinian Channel, the Sea of Corsica, the Sea of Sardinia, the Strait of Sicily, and the Tyrrhenian Sea.

The region also includes territories that are sovereign parts of Croatia, France, Slovenia, and Switzerland, as well as the four small sovereign states of the Principality of Monaco, the Republic of Malta, the Republic of San Marino, and the Vatican City State (the Holy See).

Geography

Physical geography 
In common language, the Italian region generally refers to the Italian Peninsula. Similarly, the inhabitants of the islands use the term continent to designate the mainland that goes from the Alps to Reggio Calabria. Geographically, Italy running in north-west to south-east direction can be divided into the calcareous Alps, the alluvial plain, the Northern, Central and Southern Apennines and Sicily.

Geographical limits 

The natural limits of the Italian region, marked by the Alpine drainage divide and the sea, are relatively clear, except at the western and eastern extremities of the Alps.

On the eastern borders, the chain of the Julian Alps and the Kvarner Gulf are traditionally indicated, to which Dante Alighieri also refers. However, other proposed limits include a border along the Isonzo (formerly advocated by Austrian Empire), which would exclude the upper Isonzo valley, Trieste and Istria entirely. Other borders were listed by the historian and exile Chersino Luigi Tomaz in "The border of Italy in Istria and Dalmatia", among which, in the Augustan regional structure of Roman Italy, the administrative limes along the Arsa River, marked the end of Venetia et Histria.

Therefore to the east, despite the more depressed character of the orography and the scarcity of surface hydrography found in the region south of the Nauporto pass near Postumia, the continuity of the mountain bulwark is ensured by the reliefs placed between Mount Pomario and Mount Nevoso, its terminal pillar, where it reaches the Kvarner Gulf and the Bay of Buccari, immediately south-east of Fiume. To the east, therefore, the extreme limit of Italy is generally identified in Buccari. To the south-east of the Nauporto pass and to the north-west of Mount Pomario, the traceability of the natural border is rather difficult as in this area the hydrographic watershed does not coincide with the orographic chain, which is characterized by rather small peaks.

As for the islands of Cherso and Lussino, their belonging to the Italian geographical region may vary according to the sources and interpretations. In particular, they are included in the Italian geographical region as these islands are the natural continuation of Istria, being closer to the Istrian coasts than to the Dalmatian ones.

On the contrary, to the west, the boundary is unchallenged and easily definable between the canton of Valais, Savoy, Aosta Valley and Piedmont, near the coast can be represented by that buttress of the Maritime Alps which, detaching itself from the Po-French drainage divide in correspondence with Monte Clapier, follows the Authion Massif, which culminates in Mont Bégo, and divides the Roia basin to the east from the Varo and Paglione basins to the west. The salient created by the side valley of the Bevera including the Mentone basin is orographically separated from everything, thus grafting the border at Capo d'Aglio where the entire Principality of Monaco is included. Due to the characteristic of being orographically separated from everything, the Menton basin can be excluded. In the latter case, the geographical limit would rejoin the current international state border at the height of Mount Buletta, corresponding with it up to the sea (this is not a priori correspondence but a simple correspondence by convergence between the geographical and political border; the latter is cited for convenience). 

This solution makes it possible to bring the border of the Italian geographic region closer to the ethno-linguistic one between Ligurian, Intemelio and Occitan languages of the Niçard dialect. Another hypothesis would have it that the border, after touching the top of Mont Pelat, includes the entire basin of the Varo river with its tributaries, placing Nice within the Italian region, or that, albeit smaller, than from Monte Clapier divides the Roia and Paglione basins on one side from that of the Varo on the other, reaching the coast not far from the latter's mouth, south-west of Nice, thus leaving Nice still in the geographic region of Italy (as Francesco Petrarca already claimed in 1331). However, there is an opposite thesis, supported by Charles de Gaulle at the end of World War II, which, assigning the nature of a transalpine pass to Colle di Tenda, excludes the entire Roia Valley with Ventimiglia from the Italian physical region.

Continental and peninsular part 

In a narrow sense, the continental part, delimited to the north by the Alpine watershed, to about 40% of the Italian region and is located in the north of an imaginary line that goes from the mouth of the Magra river to that of the Rubicone river. Most of them are made up of the water catchment areas of the Po, Adige, Brenta, Piave, Tagliamento and Isonzo rivers. From the continental part, however, some Alpine valleys are excluded which, although they are part of the Italian State, such as the Val di Lei tributary of the North Sea through the Rhine river, the Val di Livigno, the Sella di Dobbiaco and the Tarvisio basin to the north-east of the Camporosso saddle, tributaries of the Black Sea through rivers affluent of the Danube.

The Italian Peninsula, or the Italic Peninsula or the Apennine Peninsula, is a peninsula on the European continent crossed by the Apennine chain and delimited by four seas: the Ligurian Sea, the Tyrrhenian Sea, the Ionian Sea and the Adriatic Sea. Together with the Iberian Peninsula and the Balkan Peninsula, they are the three peninsulas that make up Southern Europe.

The peninsula in a narrow sense begins from the Tuscan-Romagna Apennines, starting from an imaginary line that goes from the mouth of the Magra river to that of the Rubicone river, and extends to the extreme southern offshoot of Capo Spartivento in Calabria. The closest large islands, Sicily, Sardinia, and Corsica, are not parts of it. The peninsula corresponds to about 45% of the Italian geographical region.

Insular part 
Outside these large islands, numerous smaller islands, often grouped in archipelagos, are found along the Italian coast, mostly in the Tyrrhenian Sea. The list below shows the largest islands belonging to the Italian geographical region:

Extreme points 
The extreme points of the Italian geographical region, measured with respect to the Greenwich meridian, are:

 to the north, the Testa Gemella Occidentale in the Aurine Alps, in Alto Adige/Südtirol, at 47° 04′ 20″ north;
 to the south, the South Cape of the Piccolo Sciutu rock, in the Maltese Archipelago, at 35° 47′ 04″ north;
 to the east, Capo d'Otranto, in Apulia, Italy, at 18° 31′ 13″ east longitude.
 to the west, the Rocca di Chardonnet in the Cottian Alps, in France, at 6° 32′ 52″ east.
The orthodromic distance N–S is 1,269 km.

Political geography 

The Italian Republic occupies 93% of the Italian geographical region. The remaining portion (23 000 km²) is divided between several other states, some of which (in order of geographical extension: Malta, San Marino, Monaco, and Vatican City) are entirely included in the political borders. Some strips of western Niçard and the Alpine sector near the French border (Italian up to the 1947 Peace Treaty), Corsica, Italian Switzerland, the Maltese Islands, and Julian March, Slovenian and Croatian, are also ascribed to the Italian geographical region, including the city of Fiume.

The following countries are entirely included in the limits of the Italian geographical region:

 the Principality of Monaco (entirely included in the continental part, to the west);
 the Republic of Malta (entirely included in the insular part, to the south);
 the Republic of San Marino (entirely included in the peninsular part, to the north-east);
 the Vatican City State (entirely included in the peninsular part, in the center-west).

The following areas also fall within the borders of the Italian geographical region:

 in Croatia (partly included in the continental part and in the insular part, in the east):
Istria, the city of Fiume, the Pelagosa archipelago and, according to an extensive thesis, the two islands of Cherso and Lussino;
 in France (partly included in the continental part and in the insular part, to the west):
Corsica and the Roia Valley (with Briga Marittima and Tenda, sold with the Treaty of Paris of 1947), Colle del Monginevro, Valle Stretta behind Bardonecchia, the area of Mont Chaberton near the Montgenevre pass, the Colle area Mont Cenis with the Mont Cenis lake (also ceded with the 1947 Treaty of Paris), and the Mentone basin up to Turbìa;
 in Slovenia (partly included in the continental part, to the east):
the Slovenian Julian Alps (Slovenian Gorizia), a part of western Carniola and the Slovene Littoral;
 in Switzerland (partly included in the continental part, to the north):
the upper Val Divedro in the canton of Valais, the Canton of Ticino (with the exception of the upper valley of the Reuss and the Val Cadlimo with the Piz Blas) as well as - in the Canton of Grisons - the Val Mesolcina, the Val Calanca, the Val Bregaglia, the Val Poschiavo and Val Monastero (all, except the latter, in any case constituting Italian-speaking Switzerland).

Three alpine valleys, tributaries of the Rhine and Danube, as well as Lampedusa and Lampione of the Pelagie Islands (small islands located on the African continental shelf) are parts of the Italian Republic even though they are not parts of the Italian geographical region.

History

Ancient times

The idea of Italy as a geographic region is very old. It was described with the geographical notion of peninsula as early as the 1st century BC in the oldest treatise called Geographica (in ancient Greek: Γεωγραφικά - Gheographikà), a work in 17 volumes by the Greek geographer Strabo (65/64 – 25/21 BC). In the 15th century, Guarino da Verona translated the entire work into Latin, thus contributing to its rediscovery.

In the introduction of his book, Strabo gives his definition of Italy:

Middle Ages
For several centuries, the geographical description of Strabo did not change until the publication of the first universal geography of Conrad Malte-Brun (1775–1826), Geography or description of all parts of the world.

After the fall of the Western Roman Empire, and in particular with the arrival of the Lombards, Italy lost its political unity. In the Carolingian age, a new Kingdom of Italy was born (in Latin, Regnum Italicum), it includes only Northern Italy. In addition, starting from the 12th century, Northern Italy itself found itself divided into a myriad of small states often in conflict with each other or victims of foreign expansionist aims.

However, in the 14th century, Dante Alighieri wrote in the Divine Comedy (L'Inferno, Canto IX, 114):

Similarly, Francesco Petrarca wrote at the same time in his work the Il Canzoniere (s. CXLVI, 13-14):

19th century

Napoleonic era 
In his memoirs written during his captivity on the island of Saint Helena, but published only in 2010, Napoleon Bonaparte makes a description of Italy in the first chapter:

Italian unification and the effects of nationalism 

After the fall of Napoleon and the restoration of the absolutist monarchical regimes, Italy remains according to Metternich's expression "a simple geographical expression" without political unity. However, a process has been set in motion that will lead to the unification of Italy.

After the proclamation of Vittorio Emanuele II King of Italy on 17 March 1861, the new united Italy experienced the birth of the Italian nationalism and the Italian irredentism, which claimed that the natural border of Italy had to pass on the crest of the Alps based on geographical concepts. Furthermore, the environment that gravitates around the Società Geografica Italiana of Rome and the Società di Studi Geografici of Florence was strongly imbued with a nationalist spirit which, during the following decades, will become more and more colonialist and militarist. This would explain, as Lucio Gambi demonstrated, the enthusiastic and almost unanimous adhesion of Italian geographers to fascism a few decades later.

20th century 
After World War I, the notion of the Italian geographical region diminished, as the natural borders, except for some marginal territory, were mostly reached with the annexation of Trentino-Alto Adige and Julian March, and it was on other scales that Italian nationalism and imperialism were expressed, well beyond the borders of the Italian geographical region.

After World War II, Italy lost a large part of Julian March, and Italian geography eliminated all political and nationalistic aspects to focus only on geographic ones. Therefore, the notion of Italian geographic region, including territories that are not part of the Italian Republic, continues to be present in some Italian geographic encyclopedias, such as the one published by the De Agostini.

Notes

References 

regions of Europe
Geography of Southern Europe
Geography of Italy
Geography of Malta
Geography of Corsica
Geography of France
Geography of Switzerland
Geography of Croatia
Geography of Slovenia